The Convention on the Privileges and Immunities of the United Nations is a Convention passed by the United Nations General Assembly on 13 February 1946 in New York. It is sometimes referred to as the New York Convention. It defines and specifies numerous issues relating to the status of the United Nations, its assets, and officials, in terms of the privileges and immunities that must be granted to them by its member states. , it has been ratified by 162 of the 193 UN member states.

On 21 November 1947, the Convention on Privileges and Immunities of the Specialized Agencies was adopted by GA resolution 179(II) to extend similar privileges to the specialized agencies of the UN. This convention has been ratified by 127 states.

Key provisions 
 Establishes Juridical personality of the UN (Art. I)
 UN premises shall be inviolable, and UN property shall be immune from search, requisition, confiscation etc. (Art. II)
 UN shall be exempt from taxes and customs duties as well as prohibitions and restrictions on imports and exports (Art. II)
 Diplomatic immunity of communications and mail (pouch) (Art. III)
 Functional immunity of delegates (Art. IV), officials (Art. V) and experts (Art. VI)
 Recognition of United Nations Laissez-Passer (Art. VII)

The conventions are in force "with regard to each State which has deposited an instrument of accession with the Secretary-General of the United Nations as from the date of its deposit", i.e. not merely by a state's membership in the UN. Twenty-three states have accepted the conventions only with some reservations.

References
Convention on the Privileges and Immunities of the United Nations
 Original text on the United Nations website
 Dates of accession, Declarations and Reservations

Convention on Privileges and Immunities of the Specialized Agencies
 Original Text
 Convention on Privileges and Immunities of the Specialized Agencies – Dates of accession, Declarations and Reservations

References

External links
 Introductory note by August Reinisch and procedural history note on the Convention on the Privileges and Immunities of the United Nations and the Convention on the Privileges and Immunities of the Specialized Agencies in the Historic Archives of the United Nations Audiovisual Library of International Law
 Status Page of the Convention on the Privileges and Immunities of the United Nations in the UN website

United Nations legislation
Treaties concluded in 1946
Treaties entered into force in 1946
Treaties of the Kingdom of Afghanistan
Treaties of the People's Socialist Republic of Albania
Treaties of Algeria
Treaties of the People's Republic of Angola
Treaties of Antigua and Barbuda
Treaties of Argentina
Treaties of Armenia
Treaties of Australia
Treaties of Austria
Treaties of Azerbaijan
Treaties of the Bahamas
Treaties of Bahrain
Treaties of Bangladesh
Treaties of Barbados
Treaties of the Byelorussian Soviet Socialist Republic
Treaties of Belgium
Treaties of Belize
Treaties of Bolivia
Treaties of Bosnia and Herzegovina
Treaties of Botswana
Treaties of the Second Brazilian Republic
Treaties of Brunei
Treaties of the People's Republic of Bulgaria
Treaties of Burkina Faso
Treaties of Myanmar
Treaties of Burundi
Treaties of the Kingdom of Cambodia (1953–1970)
Treaties of Cameroon
Treaties of Canada
Treaties of the Central African Republic
Treaties of Chad
Treaties of Chile
Treaties of the People's Republic of China
Treaties of Colombia
Treaties of the Democratic Republic of the Congo (1964–1971)
Treaties of the Republic of the Congo
Treaties of Costa Rica
Treaties of Ivory Coast
Treaties of Croatia
Treaties of Cuba
Treaties of Cyprus
Treaties of the Czech Republic
Treaties of Czechoslovakia
Treaties of Denmark
Treaties of Djibouti
Treaties of Dominica
Treaties of the Dominican Republic
Treaties of East Timor
Treaties of Ecuador
Treaties of the Kingdom of Egypt
Treaties of El Salvador
Treaties of Eritrea
Treaties of Estonia
Treaties of the Ethiopian Empire
Treaties of Fiji
Treaties of Finland
Treaties of the French Fourth Republic
Treaties of Gabon
Treaties of the Gambia
Treaties of Georgia (country)
Treaties of West Germany
Treaties of East Germany
Treaties of Ghana
Treaties of the Kingdom of Greece
Treaties of Guatemala
Treaties of Guinea
Treaties of Haiti
Treaties of Honduras
Treaties of the Hungarian People's Republic
Treaties of Iceland
Treaties of the Dominion of India
Treaties of Indonesia
Treaties of Pahlavi Iran
Treaties of the Kingdom of Iraq
Treaties of Ireland
Treaties of Israel
Treaties of Italy
Treaties of Jamaica
Treaties of Japan
Treaties of Jordan
Treaties of Kazakhstan
Treaties of Kenya
Treaties of South Korea
Treaties of Kuwait
Treaties of Kyrgyzstan
Treaties of the Kingdom of Laos
Treaties of Latvia
Treaties of Lebanon
Treaties of Lesotho
Treaties of Liberia
Treaties of the Kingdom of Libya
Treaties of Liechtenstein
Treaties of Lithuania
Treaties of Luxembourg
Treaties of North Macedonia
Treaties of Madagascar
Treaties of Malawi
Treaties of Malaysia
Treaties of the Maldives
Treaties of Mali
Treaties of Malta
Treaties of Mauritius
Treaties of Mexico
Treaties of the Federated States of Micronesia
Treaties of Moldova
Treaties of Monaco
Treaties of the Mongolian People's Republic
Treaties of Montenegro
Treaties of Morocco
Treaties of Mozambique
Treaties of Namibia
Treaties of Nepal
Treaties of the Netherlands
Treaties of New Zealand
Treaties of Nicaragua
Treaties of Niger
Treaties of Nigeria
Treaties of Norway
Treaties of the Dominion of Pakistan
Treaties of Panama
Treaties of Papua New Guinea
Treaties of Paraguay
Treaties of Peru
Treaties of the Philippines
Treaties of the Polish People's Republic
Treaties of Portugal
Treaties of Qatar
Treaties of the Socialist Republic of Romania
Treaties of Rwanda
Treaties of Saint Kitts and Nevis
Treaties of Saint Lucia
Treaties of Saint Vincent and the Grenadines
Treaties of San Marino
Treaties of Saudi Arabia
Treaties of Senegal
Treaties of Serbia and Montenegro
Treaties of Seychelles
Treaties of Sierra Leone
Treaties of Singapore
Treaties of Slovakia
Treaties of Slovenia
Treaties of the Somali Republic
Treaties of South Africa
Treaties of the Soviet Union
Treaties of Francoist Spain
Treaties of Sri Lanka
Treaties of the Democratic Republic of the Sudan
Treaties of Suriname
Treaties of Sweden
Treaties of Switzerland
Treaties of the Syrian Republic (1930–1963)
Treaties of Tajikistan
Treaties of Tanganyika
Treaties of Thailand
Treaties of Togo
Treaties of Trinidad and Tobago
Treaties of Tunisia
Treaties of Turkey
Treaties of Turkmenistan
Treaties of Uganda
Treaties of the Ukrainian Soviet Socialist Republic
Treaties of the United Arab Emirates
Treaties of the United Kingdom
Treaties of the United States
Treaties of Uruguay
Treaties of Uzbekistan
Treaties of Venezuela
Treaties of Vietnam
Treaties of the Yemen Arab Republic
Treaties of Yugoslavia
Treaties of Zambia
Treaties of Zimbabwe
United Nations treaties
United Nations Convention
1946 in New York City
Treaties adopted by United Nations General Assembly resolutions
Treaties extended to the Faroe Islands
Treaties extended to Greenland
Treaties extended to the Netherlands Antilles
Treaties extended to Aruba
Treaties extended to Macau
Treaties extended to West Berlin